Patrizia Luconi (born 24 October 1970) is an Italian gymnast. She competed in five events at the 1988 Summer Olympics.

Eponymous skill
Luconi has one eponymous skill listed in the Code of Points.

References

External links
 

1970 births
Living people
Italian female artistic gymnasts
Olympic gymnasts of Italy
Gymnasts at the 1988 Summer Olympics
Sportspeople from Rimini
Originators of elements in artistic gymnastics